The 2022 Queen's Club Championships (also known as the cinch Championships for sponsorship reasons) was a men's professional tennis tournament played on outdoor grass courts at the Queen's Club in London, United Kingdom from 13 to 19 June 2022. It was the 119th edition of the event and was classified as an ATP Tour 500 tournament on the 2022 ATP Tour.

Champions

Singles

  Matteo Berrettini def.  Filip Krajinović, 7–5, 6–4

Doubles

  Nikola Mektić /  Mate Pavić def.  Lloyd Glasspool /  Harri Heliövaara, 3–6, 7–6(7–3), [10–6]

Points and prize money

Points distribution

Prize money 

*per team

ATP singles main-draw entrants

Seeds

1 Rankings are as of June 6, 2022.

Other entrants
The following players received wildcards into the main draw: 
  Liam Broady
  Jack Draper
  Ryan Peniston

The following player received entry as a special exempt:
  Andy Murray

The following player received entry using a protected ranking:
  Stan Wawrinka

The following players received entry from the qualifying draw:
  Quentin Halys 
  Paul Jubb
  Sam Querrey
  Emil Ruusuvuori

The following player received entry as a lucky loser:
  Denis Kudla

Withdrawals
Before the tournament
  Carlos Alcaraz → replaced by  Filip Krajinović
  Gaël Monfils → replaced by  Francisco Cerúndolo
  Andy Murray → replaced by  Denis Kudla

ATP doubles main-draw entrants

Seeds

1 Rankings are as of June 6, 2022.

Other entrants
The following pairs received wildcards into the doubles main draw:
  Lloyd Glasspool /  Harri Heliövaara
  Jonny O'Mara /  Ken Skupski

The following pair received entry from the qualifying draw:
  André Göransson /  Ben McLachlan

References

External links
 Official website
 ATP Tour website

 
2022 ATP Tour
2022 sports events in London
2022 in English tennis
June 2022 sports events in the United Kingdom
2022